Aliyu Gebi (born 17 January 1975) is a Special Adviser to the Minister of Interior and former member of the Nigerian Federal House of Representatives as well as The ECOWAS parliament. He was chairman House Committee on Internal Security in the federal house and deputy chairman Committee on Trade, Customs and Free Movement of Persons at the ECOWAS Parliament. He attended Kobi Primary School Bauchi and graduated from Abubakar Tafawa Balewa University Bauchi State in the year 1998 where he studied Computer Science with Advanced Mathematics and became a software engineer and public speaker. He has undertaken projects in the state with aid from organizations such as the Millennium Development Goal (MDG) Agency. These projects include drilling of boreholes, installation of electricity transformers and renovation of schools in different Local Government Areas.

Work history 

Member ECOWAS Parliament Deputy Chairman - ECOWAS Committee on Trade,

Member House of Representatives Chairman - House Committee on Internal Security of the 7th Assembly, Federal House of Representatives, Nigeria. Member of the following Committees:-

Academic qualification

Political affiliations

Professional qualification / achievements

References

Members of the House of Representatives (Nigeria)
1975 births
Place of birth missing (living people)
Living people
Abubakar Tafawa Balewa University alumni